Al Merreikh may refer to:

Al-Merrikh SC, Sudanese football club based in Omdurman
Al-Merrikh Stadium, their stadium
Al-Merreikh SC (Al-Fasher), Sudanese football club based in Al-Fasher
Al Merreikh FC (Juba), South Sudanese football club based in Juba
Al-Merreikh Al-Thagher, Sudanese football club based in Al-Thager
Al Merreikh SC (Egypt), Egyptian football club based in Port Said